Reason Run is a  long 1st order tributary to the Youghiogheny River in Fayette County, Pennsylvania.

Course
Reason Run rises about 1 mile northeast of Asher Glade, Maryland in Garrett County, and then flows north-northeasterly into Fayette County, Pennsylvania to join the Youghiogheny River in Youghiogheny River Lake about 1.5 miles southwest of Somerfield.

Watershed
Reason Run drains  of area, receives about 46.7 in/year of precipitation, has a wetness index of 330.63, and is about 75% forested.

See also
List of rivers of Maryland
List of rivers of Pennsylvania

References

Tributaries of the Youghiogheny River
Rivers of Pennsylvania
Rivers of Fayette County, Pennsylvania
Rivers of Garrett County, Maryland